The twelfth season of the Dutch reality singing competition The Voice of Holland premiered on 7 January 2022 on RTL4. Host Martijn Krabbé, Chantal Janzen, as well as backstage host Geraldine Kemper, as well as the three coaches from the previous season, Waylon, Ali B and Anouk all returned, while Jan Smit was replaced by Glennis Grace.   Jamai Loman returned as backstage host after a two-season hiatus.

This season marks the first time in the show's history to feature a fifth coach, Typhoon & season 6 winner Maan de Steenwinkel, who selected participants to participate in the Comeback stage. Also, this season marks the introduction of the block button, as first introduced in the fourteenth season of the American version. In addition to the familiar button for his chair, each coach gets three smaller buttons with the names of the other coaches on it. If someone presses the block button, the coach who has been pressed can no longer claim the talent. However, the blocked coach only sees this when he tries to turn around himself. To ensure that the coaches cannot block each other indefinitely, they can only use their block button once in the entire blind audition.

On 15 January 2022, after just two episodes aired, it was announced that the season would be suspended indefinitely due to abuse of power and sexual misconduct allegations against crew members of the show. Jeroen Rietbergen, bandleader of The Voice, made a statement acknowledging sexual misconduct, apologized and resigned. The following day, one of the four coaches, Anouk, announced on her Instagram that after reading the Jeroen Rietbergen statement, as well as several telephone calls, she had made up her mind and will not be returning to the show. Days later, coach Ali B was suspended from RTL due to the pending investigations.

Teams 
Color key

Blind Auditions 

The blind auditions premiered on 7 January 2022. A new feature within the Blind Auditions this season is the Block, which each coach can use once to prevent one of the other coaches from getting a contestant.

Color key

Episode 1 (7 January)

Episode 2 (14 January)

Episode 3 (planned 21 January, suspended indefinitely)

References 

The Voice of Holland
2022 Dutch television seasons
Television controversies in the Netherlands